The Permanent Representative of Sri Lanka to the United Nations is Sri Lanka's foremost diplomatic representative to the United Nations, and in charge of the country's mission to the UN. The position of Permanent Representative is equivalent in rank to an Ambassador, and entitles them to use the style His/Her Excellency.

The current Permanent Representative is Aliyar Azeez.

List of heads of mission
Sir Senerat Gunewardene, KBE (1956–1958)
Sir Claude Corea, KBE (1958–1961)
Prof Gunapala Mallalasekera (1961–1963)
Sir Senerat Gunewardene, KBE (1963–1965)
Francis de S Jayaratne (1965–1967)
Hamilton Shirley Amerasinghe (1967–1978)
Biyagamage J Fernando (1978–1980)
Ignatius Benedict Fonseka (1980–1984)
Nissanka Wijewardane (1984–1987)
Daya Perera (1988–1991)
Stanley Kalpage (1991–1994)
Herman Leonard de Silva (1995–1998)
John de Saram (1998–2002)
C Mahendran (2002–2004)
Bernard Goonetilleke (Acting) (2004–2005)
Prasad Kariyawasam (2005–2008)
H. M. G. S. Palihakkara (2008–2009)
Palitha Kohona (2009–2015)
A. Rohan Perera (2015–2018)
A.L.A. Azeez (2018– )

References

External links
 Official Webpage of the Sri Lanka Permanent Representative to the United Nations

Sri Lanka
 
United Nations